Kenneth Paul Block (November 21, 1967 – January 2, 2023) was an American professional rally driver with the Hoonigan Racing Division, formerly known as the Monster World Rally Team. Block was also one of the co-founders of DC Shoes. He also competed in many action sports events, including skateboarding, snowboarding, and motocross.

After selling his ownership of DC Shoes, Block shifted his business focus to Hoonigan Industries, an apparel brand for auto enthusiasts. He was the co-owner and "Head Hoonigan In Charge" (HHIC) at the company before his death in a snowmobile accident in January 2023.

Rallying

2005 
In 2005, Block began his National rallying career with the Vermont Sports Car team. Vermont SportsCar prepared a 2005 Subaru WRX STi for Block to compete. His first event of the rallying season was Sno*Drift, where he ended up finishing seventh overall and fifth in the Group N class. During the 2005 season, Block had five top five finishes and placed third overall in the Group A class and fourth overall in the Rally America National Championship. At the end of his first rallying year, Ken Block had won the Rally America Rookie of the Year award.

2006 
In 2006, Block, along with his DC rally teammate Travis Pastrana, signed a new sponsorship deal with Subaru. Through this deal with Subaru, the teammates became known as "Subaru Rally Team USA." With the new rally season, Block also got a brand-new Vermont SportsCar prepped 2006 Subaru WRX STi. He competed in the first-ever X Games rally event at X Games XII. In the competition, Block ended up finishing third to take the bronze. He went on to compete in the 2006 Rally America National Championship, where he finished second overall.

2007 

In 2007, Block competed in the X Games XIII rally event, where he placed second overall and won a silver medal. In the 2007 Rally America National Championship, Block finished third overall. During this season, Block also entered in a few rounds of the World Rally Championship; Rally Mexico and Rally New Zealand. In Rally New Zealand, Block recorded two top-five stage times in the Group N class. At the end of 2007, Block had achieved 19 podiums and 8 overall victories in rally events.

2008 
In 2008, Block was provided with a brand-new rally-prepped 2008 Subaru WRX STi to compete. Block decided to compete in the Rallye Baie-des Chaleurs of the Canadian Rally Championship to gain some experience with his new 2008 rally car and prepare for the World Rally Championships later in the year. Block gained his first Canadian rally win at the event. This was only the second event for the new car. Block and his co-driver were unable to get any championship points at the event due to not having a Canadian competition license.
Block competed in the Rally New York USA competition and finished in first place.
In the X Games XIV rally competition, Block finished tied for third place with Dave Mirra. This occurrence was due to both competitors having issues with their car. Block, who made it to the semi-finals of the event, had a radiator problem after landing the car awkwardly on a jump. With both bronze place competitors in damaged cars unable to compete, the medals were awarded to both of them.

Block competed in the 2008 Rally America National championship, which concluded on October 17, 2008. In the event, he finished second overall with a strong victory in the last event. In the Lake Superior Performance Rally (LSPR) stage, Block finished over one minute ahead of his next closest competitor and secured the second overall position. Next up for Block this rally season is three World Rally Championship events.

2009 

Block appeared in a segment of motoring show Top Gear.
Block filmed the hit YouTube video "Gymkhana 2".

2010 
For 2010, Block ended his partnership with Subaru, and joined Ford to compete part-time at the World Rally Championship for Monster World Rally Team, where he drove a Ford Focus RS WRC 08 together with long time co-driver Alex Gelsomino. Block therefore became the first ever American driver to campaign for the World Rally Championship. He scored two points after finishing 9th at the Spain. Also, he ran his sixth season of the Rally America Championship in an open class Ford Fiesta, as well as his fifth X Games. On February 27, Block won the Rally in the 100 Acre Wood (Rally America) for the 5th consecutive time.  This broke the record held by John Buffum.

2011 
On March 23, Block and his co-driver Alex Gelsomino were taken to hospital, having rolled their Ford Fiesta RS WRC during the shakedown stage of the 2011 Rally de Portugal in Faro, Portugal A representative of the Monster World Rally team later stated that both men were fine. He finished 8th at the France and 9th at Wales, scoring 6 points.

2013 

On his first race of 2013 season, Block scored well, entering top-ten in the Mexican rally, thus receiving his first six points for the championship and scored a best-ever 7th overall finish.

2014 

Castrol returned as Block's sponsor. He participated in the WRC located in Catalunya, Spain. He was in 10th place until the last stage where he suffered a tire puncture and lost a significant amount of time. He finished in 12th, which was his second to last season at the WRC.

Rallycross

X Games 
Block's X Games results are as follows:

 2006: 3rd, 
 2007: 2nd, 
 2008: 3rd, 
 2009: 7th
 2010:
 Rally Racing: 10th
 RallyCross: 7th
 2011:
 Rally Racing: 11th
 RallyCross: 13th
 2012: 2nd, 
 2013:
 Foz do Iguaçu: 8th
 Munich: 2nd, 
 Los Angeles: 6th
 2014: 12th
 2015: 11th

American rallycross 
Block competed at the Global RallyCross Championship from 2011 to 2015. He finished runner-up in 2014 and third in 2013 and fifth in 2012, collecting six wins and 15 podiums.

Block returned full-time for the 2018 Americas Rallycross Championship, where he claimed two podiums and ranked fourth in points.

European rallycross 
In 2014, Block was third in the Norway round of the FIA World Rallycross Championship and won the Norway round of the European Rallycross Championship.

For the 2016 season, Block decided to compete full-time in the World Rallycross Championship.

At Hockenheimring, Germany, Block finished third in the Supercar Final and achieved his second podium in the series.

In 2017, he finished 9th in points, with a best finish of 7th at Britain and France.

Gymkhana 
Block produced a series of gymkhana videos which have drawn millions of views on YouTube.

In 2009, for the BBC show Top Gear, Block took James May out for Gymkhana-style driving at Block's stunt course at Inyokern Airport, an operational California airport, also starring Ricky Carmichael. In 2010 Block took the feature car from the previous episode (a Reliant Robin) for a lap of the Top Gear test track. He rolled the car and was unable to complete a lap but was unhurt.

On August 24, 2010, Block released the first of a three part Gymkhana 3 video release featuring his new Ford Fiesta.

On September 14, 2010, Block's third Gymkhana video, featuring a Ford Fiesta, was released on YouTube. The video got more than seven million views in its first week.

On August 16, 2011, the fourth Gymkhana video, The Hollywood Megamercial was released on YouTube, featuring Block driving around the Universal Studios backlot.

On July 9, 2012, Block released his fifth Gymkhana video on YouTube, featuring Block driving his Ford Fiesta in San Francisco and Travis Pastrana on a dirtbike. After 24 hours, the video was viewed 5.1 million times, making it the top-viewed video of the previous week.

Main video series
 Ken Block Gymkhana Practice (2008; Subaru Impreza)
 Ken Block Gymkhana Two the Infomercial (2009; Subaru Impreza)
 Ken Block's Gymkhana Three, Part 2; Ultimate Playground; l'Autodrome, France (2010; Ford Fiesta)
 Ken Block's Gymkhana Four; The Hollywood Megamercial (2011; Ford Fiesta)
 Ken Block's Gymkhana Five: Ultimate Urban Playground; San Francisco (2012; Ford Fiesta)
 Ken Block's Gymkhana Six – Ultimate Gymkhana Grid Course (2013; Ford Fiesta)
 Ken Block's Gymkhana Seven: Wild in the Streets of Los Angeles (2014; Ford Mustang)
 Ken Block's Gymkhana Eight: Ultimate Exotic Playground in Dubai (2016; Ford Fiesta)
 Ken Block's Gymkhana Nine: Raw Industrial Playground (2016; Ford Focus)
 Ken Block's Gymkhana Ten: The Ultimate Tire Slaying Tour (2018; Ford Fiesta, Escort RS Cosworth, Focus, Mustang and F-150)

Other videos
 Ken Block Drifts London (2016; Ford Mustang)
 Ken Block's Climbkhana: Pikes Peak Featuring the Hoonicorn V2 (2017; Ford Mustang)
 Ken Block's Climbkhana Two: 914hp Hoonitruck on China's Most Dangerous Road; Tianmen Mountain (2019; Ford F-150)
 Ken Block's Electrikhana: High Stakes Playground; Las Vegas, in the Audi S1 Hoonitron (2022; Audi S1 Hoonitron)

Locations

Other motorsport activities 
In 2005, Block, along with his DC Shoes associates, participated in the Gumball 3000 Rally. For the event, they sent out three modified 2004 Subaru WRX STis sponsored by DC Shoes.

In 2006, Block competed in the One Lap of America competition along with Brian Scotto. They were teamed up in a 2006 Subaru WRX STi and finished forty-fifth overall.

In 2007, Block joined the DC Shoes Snowboarding team at New Zealand's Snow Park. Block did massive jumps and assisted in snowboarding tricks while driving his rally car on the mountain alongside the snowboarders. A crash after landing a large jump cracked one of the vertebrae in his spine; he was flown to the hospital. The session made the cover of the December 2007 issue of Snowboarder Magazine and closed out the MTN.LAB 1.5 DVD.

In 2010, Block co-founded Gymkhana Grid, a gymkhana race held annually around the world. He won all-wheel-drive event in 2014, beating Jake Archer in the final duel.

In 2021, Block raced in the Baja 1000 in the trophy truck class finishing in 4th.

Block also holds the world record for the world's fastest snowcat, a modified Ford Raptor called the RaptorTrax.

Video games 
Block appeared in three installments of Codemasters' Dirt racing video games. Block is featured as a driver in 2009's Colin McRae: Dirt 2, along with his Subaru Rally Team USA Impreza. In 2011's Dirt 3 he is seen as a driver and gymkhana teacher, his Monster World Rally Team vehicles are available in the game, including the Ford Fiesta GYM 3, and the Ken Block Ford Focus WRC. His Hoonigan/Monster Ford Fiesta appears extensively in 2012's Dirt: Showdown, and his trademark gymkhana style of driving is featured at the Head-to-Head and Trick Rush race modes as well as the Freestyle section.

Block appears in the 2015 Need for Speed video game as the style icon.

His Hoonigan-branded cars have also featured in Microsoft's Forza racing video game series. Their first appearance was in expansion packs for Forza Horizon 3 and Forza Motorsport 7 in 2017. Later they were offered as launch cars for 2018's Forza Horizon 4 and 2021's Forza Horizon 5.

In 2021, Block started a collaboration with drag racing game CSR Racing 2.

Signature wheels 
In 2021, Ken Block collaborated with Rotiform and Fuel Off-Road through Wheel Pros to make 4 sets of signature wheels.

Rotiform KB-1 

 His 1965 Ford Mustang (aka Hoonicorn) uses the Rotiform KB-1 in a 5x120 PCD, with a 26 offset in a 18x10.5 tire width. It is a forged 3pc type wheel in gloss white.
 His 1986 Ford RS2000 uses the same wheels in a 54 offset, with a 18x9.5 tire width in a 4x108 PCD. It is a forged mono2 style wheel in gloss white.
 His 2016 Ford Focus RS uses the same wheels in a 42 offset, with a 19x18.5 tire width in a 5x108 PCD. It is a forged mono2 style wheel in gloss white.

Fuel Off-Road, the Block 

 His 1977 Ford F-150 (aka Hoonitruck) uses the Fuel Block in a 5x120 PCD, with a -48 offset in a 20x10.5 tire width. It is forged beadlock type wheel in gloss white.
 His 2017 SVC Offroad Ford F-150 Raptor uses the Fuel Block in a 6x135 PCD, with a 0 offset in a 17x9 tire width. It is forged beadlock type wheel in a matte black with a gloss black ring.
 His 2017 Ford F-150 Raptor uses the Fuel Block in a 6x135 PCD, with a 0 offset in a 17x9 tire width. It is forged beadlock type wheel in a matte black with a gloss black ring.

Rotiform VCM-E 

 His 1994 Ford Escort RS Cosworth WRC AKA Cossie V2 uses the Rotiform VCE-M in a 4x108 PCD, with a 31 offset in a 18x8.5 tire width. It is a forged 3pc in gloss white.
 His 2015 Ford Fiesta ST RX43 uses the Rotiform VCE-M in a 5x135 PCD, with a 54 offset in a 18x8.5 tire width. It is a forged Monoblock style wheel in gloss white.

Rotiform GTB 
His 1978 Ford Escort Mk2 RS uses the Rotiform GTB in a 4x108 PCD, with a 13 offset in a 17x9 tire width. It is a forged Monoblock style wheel in gloss white.

Other appearances on TV/YouTube 
Ken Block has made a minor appearance on the MotorTrend show Ignition with Jonny Lieberman. The purpose of his appearance was to promote the 2017 Ford Raptor. Block also appeared on BBC One's Top Gear where he drifted his Hoonicorn around the empty streets of London.

Death 
On January 2, 2023, Ken Block died at age 55 in a snowmobile accident near his ranch in Woodland, Utah. The Wasatch County sheriff's department reported that Block had been riding in the Mill Hollow area when his snowmobile upended on a steep slope and landed on top of him. Block was declared dead at the scene of the accident. As a mark of respect, the number 43 would be retired from the World Rally Championship for the 2023 season in his honor. Hoonigan confirmed in a statement on Instagram, "It's with our deepest regrets that we can confirm that Ken Block passed away in a snowmobile accident today. Ken was a visionary, a pioneer and an icon. And most importantly, a father and husband. He will be incredibly missed."

Racing record

Complete Rally America results 
(key)

Complete WRC results 
(key)

PWRC results

Complete Global Rallycross Championship results 
(key)

Supercar

Complete Americas Rallycross Championship results 
(key)

Supercar

Complete FIA European Rallycross Championship results 
(key)

Supercar

Complete FIA World Rallycross Championship results 
(key)

Supercar 

† Five championship points deducted for receiving three reprimands in a season.

Explanatory notes

References

Sources

External links 

 Hoonigan – Official Site
 Hoonigan Racing Division – Official site
 Ken Block Official Merchandise
 
 Ken Block Interview
 Gymkhana racing improved by Ken Block, Video, c. 4 min.

1967 births
2023 deaths
Accidental deaths in Utah
American Internet celebrities
American rally drivers
American sports businesspeople
American stunt performers
Businesspeople from California
European Rallycross Championship drivers
Global RallyCross Championship drivers
People from Summit County, Utah
Racing drivers from California
Sportspeople from Long Beach, California
World Rally Championship drivers
World Rallycross Championship drivers
M-Sport drivers